Serine/threonine-protein kinase PCTAIRE-2 is an enzyme that in humans is encoded by the PCTK2 gene.

The protein encoded by this gene belongs to the cdc2/cdkx subfamily of the ser/thr family of protein kinases. It has similarity to rat protein which is thought to play a role in terminally differentiated neurons.

References

Further reading

EC 2.7.11